Andrea Conti (born 23 August 1977) is an Italian football manager and former forward.

He is the son of the 1982 World Cup winner Bruno Conti. His brother Daniele was also a professional footballer.

External links

Profile at Swiss Football League 

1977 births
Living people
Italian footballers
Italian expatriate footballers
Italian expatriate sportspeople in Switzerland
Expatriate footballers in Switzerland
A.S. Roma players
A.S.D. Castel di Sangro Calcio players
S.S. Virtus Lanciano 1924 players
A.C. Ancona players
AC Bellinzona players
Calcio Lecco 1912 players
Swiss Super League players
Association football forwards
Footballers from Rome